Girl Code is the debut studio album by American hip hop duo City Girls, released on November 16, 2018 by Quality Control Music, it has sold over 200,000 units and  peaked in the top half of the Billboard 200 at number 55. It was released six months after their first mixtape Period in May, and while member Jatavia Shakara "JT" Johnson was incarcerated for credit card fraud. The remix of the song "Twerk" featuring Cardi B became City Girls' first entry on the US Billboard Hot 100 after debuting at number 92; it has since peaked at number 29.

Background
City Girls released their first mixtape Period in May 2018; they received wider notice after being featured on Drake's single "In My Feelings", reached number one on the US Billboard Hot 100 that summer. JT had pled guilty to credit card fraud that January - and turned herself in for a two-year prison sentence in June; consequently, she and Yung Miami recorded much of Period and Girl Code during the same studio sessions.

Critical reception

Upon its release, the album attained positive reviews. In a profile of the duo, titled "The Ferocious, Feel-Good Rap of City Girls' Girl Code," New Yorker music journalist Carrie Battan commended the album as "one of the more convincing and commanding performances of the year," and singled out the group as one of the few female rap artists to attain success.

Track listing
Credits adapted from AllMusic.

Charts

Weekly charts

Year-end charts

References

External links

2018 debut albums
City Girls albums
Capitol Records albums
Motown albums
Quality Control Music albums